Remington Arms Company, LLC was an American manufacturer of firearms and ammunition, now broken into two companies, each bearing the Remington name. The firearms manufacturer is Remington Arms. The ammunition business is called Remington. The company which was broken up was called Remington Outdoor Company. Sturm, Ruger & Co. purchased the Marlin Firearms division of the Remington Outdoor Company in 2020.

Founded in 1816 by Eliphalet Remington (as E. Remington and Sons) in Ilion, New York, it was one of the oldest gun makers in the US and claimed to be the oldest factory in the US that still made its original product. The company was the largest rifle manufacturer in North America according to 2015 ATF statistics. The company developed or adopted more cartridges than any other gun maker or ammunition manufacturer in the world.

History

19th century origins

The Remington company was founded in 1816. Eliphalet Remington II (1793–1861) believed he could build a better gun than he could buy. Remington began designing and building a flintlock rifle for himself. At age 23 (in late 1816), he entered a shooting match; though he finished second, his well-made gun impressed other contestants. Before Remington left the field that day, he had received so many orders from other competitors that he had officially entered the gunsmithing business. By 1828, he moved his operation to nearby Ilion. The modern Remington firearms plant still uses this site.

On March 7, 1888, the Remington family sold the ownership of E. Remington & Sons to new owners, Marcellus Hartley and Partners. This consisted of Hartley and Graham of New York, New York, a major sporting goods chain that also owned the Union Metallic Cartridge Company in Bridgeport and the Winchester Repeating Arms Company of New Haven, both in Connecticut. At this time, the company formally changed its name to the Remington Arms Company.

20th century

When the US entered the war, Remington became deeply involved in the war effort. Remington was left with huge stocks of guns and ammunition and no prospects for payment. The US government purchased the firearms.

During the Great Depression, Remington was purchased by DuPont, which had made its name with improvements to gunpowder. A year later, Remington purchased the Peters Cartridge Company; today, many of the Remington headstamps still have "R-P" on them for Remington-Peters.

In 1940, the US Army became worried about its ammunition capacity and asked Remington to collaborate on a plan for national expansion. With the aid of DuPont, Remington built the Lake City Army Ammunition Plant (named Lake City Arsenal initially) and Denver Ordnance ammunition plants, and three more plants later on, including the Lowell Ordnance Plant. Though the plants belonged to the US government, Remington was asked to oversee their operation. Among the weapons that Remington manufactured for the government during World War II was the famous M1903A3 Springfield bolt-action rifle.

During the 1950s and 1960s, Remington expanded into other products besides guns, with the purchase of Mall Tool Company in 1956. One of the products was chain saws.

In 1962, Remington introduced the Model 700 bolt-action rifle. The rifle became one of Remington's most successful firearms and quickly lent itself to developments of many sub-variants, including the Remington 700 BDL, Remington 700PSS for police and law enforcement agencies (the rifle, later renamed 700P, is very popular among law enforcement agencies) and the military M24 SWS, which was the United States Army standard sniper rifle between 1988 and 2010. Other armed forces worldwide still use it, such as the IDF. Other firearms companies designed and manufactured sniper rifles based on the reliable and accurate Remington Model 700 action.

In 1986, Remington closed its ammunition plant in Bridgeport, Connecticut, transferring operations to a new facility in Lonoke, Arkansas. A year later, Remington built a new clay targets plant in Athens, Georgia. According to an article in The New York Times, in 1993, Remington's parent company—DuPont de Nemours & Company (DuPont)—sold Remington to the New York investment firm Clayton, Dubilier & Rice (CD&R) for $300 million. The Times, citing the National Sporting Goods Manufacturers Association said that "rifle and shotgun sales totaled $900 million" in 1992. Citing the National Shooting Sports Foundation president, the article said that since 1986, "interest in hunting" had "declined". The sale of long guns—which represented 75% of Remington sales had become "slack" by 1993, while the sale of handguns had become the "fastest-growing segment" of the gun industry.

21st century
In June 2007, a private equity firm, Cerberus Capital Management, acquired Remington Arms for $370 million, including $252 million in assumed debt. Remington was millions of dollars in debt and did not report a profit during 2003–2005.

In December 2007, Remington Arms acquired rifle-maker Marlin Firearms. As of 2009, ammunition sales continued to remain high during the ongoing United States Ammunition Shortage. Chief Executive Officer Ted Torbeck said that consumer concerns over future restrictions, and taxes on ammunition and firearms by the Obama administration, were creating a rise in demand.

In October 2009, Remington Military products acquired suppressor manufacturer Advanced Armament Corporation.

After a 12-year absence from the handgun market, in 2010, Remington announced the Remington 1911 R1. It ceased production in 1998 of its last handgun, the Model XP-100R. Later that year, Remington introduced the Versa Max auto-loading shotgun. Its patented "Versa Port" system self-regulates gas pressure based on the length of the cartridge used, enabling the shotgun to shoot light  target loads,  hunting loads, and  magnum hunting loads.

In 2012, Remington won a US Army contract to manufacture 24,000 M4A1 carbines at $673 per unit worth $16,163,252 total.

In 2013, for the first time since 1928, Remington began to offer an air rifle, called the "Remington Express."

In 2014, the company decided to move some manufacturing from Ilion, New York to Huntsville, Alabama. The president of United Mine Workers Local 717, which represented workers at Ilion, expressed fears about the future of the New York facility and blamed the NY SAFE Act for the company's decision to favor Alabama over New York.  Subsequently, about 100 Remington jobs were shifted from New York to Alabama.

Beginning in late 2017, Remington began bankruptcy planning, having suffered declining sales and reputation; damage from an August 2017 exposé on the CBS news program “60 Minutes” about X-Mark Pro trigger defects linked to several deaths, and amassed some $950 million worth of debt. The low sales and debt were blamed on either a reduction in "panic-buying", or diminishing quality and reputation. Remington filed for bankruptcy in March 2018.  Remington exited bankruptcy on May 17, 2018, less than two months later. The company's quick exit was due to a pre-approved restructuring plan supported by 97% of its creditors, which canceled all shares of common stock issued before the bankruptcy proceedings, and the issuance of new shares to convert over $775 million of company debt into equity.

The families of nine victims and a teacher who were shot and survived the 2012 Sandy Hook Elementary School shooting with a Remington Bushmaster rifle filed a wrongful death lawsuit in Connecticut state court seeking a jury trial to recover unspecified damages. The case was briefly moved to federal court before being referred back to the state court level. In 2016, the suit was initially dismissed by a Connecticut Superior Court citing the immunity provided to firearms manufacturers by the federal Protection of Lawful Commerce in Arms Act (PLCAA) of 2005. Remington's bankruptcy delayed the suit. On March 14, 2019, the Connecticut Supreme Court ruled 4–3 that the suit's wrongful marketing claim could proceed to trial under Connecticut's Unfair Trade Practices Act (CUTPA) which addressed marketing including "truly unethical and irresponsible marketing practices promoting criminal conduct" and was not preempted by the PLCAA. The US Supreme Court declined to hear the case. On February 15, 2022, it was announced that a $73,000,000 settlement had been reached between the Sandy Hook families and Remington. The cost of the settlement was borne by insurers.

On July 28, 2020, it filed again for Chapter 11 bankruptcy protection. During the bankruptcy auction in September 2020, Remington Outdoor Company was sold in parts. The Remington Arms business and the non-Marlin firearms business was sold to Roundhill Group LLC. Remington's ammunition business, brand name and trademarks were sold to Vista Outdoor.

Relocation of production plants
On February 17, 2014, Remington announced a plan to build a new state-of-the-art plant in Huntsville, Alabama. Remington decided to move two production lines from the Ilion, New York plant as a result of the fallout from the NY SAFE Act, which restricted gun ownership in response to the Sandy Hook Elementary School shooting. AR-15 style semi-automatic rifles from Bushmaster, DPMS, and Remington Remington R-15 and 1911 style R-1 pistols were produced in the plant. The plant was touted by Alabama's Department of Commerce Secretary and by Remington as a boon to Alabama's economy. The new plant consolidated Remington's production to promote efficiency and lower production costs. Experts in the gun industry believed that Remington would eventually leave its New York roots to have its plants in more gun-friendly states.

On November 8, 2021, it was announced that Remington Firearms would relocate its global headquarters to LaGrange, Georgia. This location is planned to contain a new advanced manufacturing operation and a research and development center.

Breakup
Until 2015, Remington Arms was part of the Freedom Group, which was owned by Cerberus Capital Management. In 2014, a new plant was built in Huntsville, Alabama, to produce AR-15 style semi-automatic rifles and Remington 1911 R1 pistols. In 2015, the Freedom Group was renamed as Remington Outdoor Company.

Remington filed for Chapter 11 bankruptcy protection in March 2018, having accumulated over $950 million in debt. Remington exited bankruptcy in May 2018, less than two months after filing for protection under Chapter 11 laws. Its quick exit from bankruptcy was due to a pre-approved restructuring plan supported by 97% of its creditors.

On July 28, 2020, Remington filed again for Chapter 11 bankruptcy protection, and its assets were divided up and sold to various buyers. The Remington brand name was bought by Vista Outdoor, which uses it to market several types of ammunition.

After the breakup, two companies now use the Remington name, Remington Ammunition and Remington Arms, LLC.

Production sites
The Bushmaster AR-15 style rifle and 1911 pattern R-1 lines from Ilion, New York, were produced at a plant constructed in 2014 in Huntsville, Alabama. DPMS Panther Arms moved from St. Cloud, MN to the new Alabama facility.

Remington's former ammunition factory in Bridgeport, Connecticut, was investigated by the Travel Channel's Ghost Adventures in 2009. The site was eventually purchased by Peter DiNardo Enterprises Inc. and is scheduled for demolition.

As of 2021, Vista Outdoor doubled the number of workers at its Lonoke factory purchased out of the Remington bankruptcy auction. The facility employs 900 people.

In national symbolism
Remington rifles are incorporated into the flag and the national emblem of Guatemala.

Products
Based on a list from the Remington web site.

Rifles

Bolt-action

JuniorTarget 521TL
Remington–Keene rifle
M1903 Springfield rifle
M1917 Enfield rifle
Model 5
Model 6
Model 7
Model 30
Model 31
Model 33
Model 34
Model 241
Model 504 
Model 511 Scoremaster
Model 512 Sportmaster
Model 513
Model 541S
Model 541T
Model 580
Model 591
Model 592
Model 600
Model 660
Model 673
Model 700
Model 710
Model 720
Model 721
Model 722
Model 725
Model 770
Model 783
Model 788
Model 798
Model 799
Modular Sniper Rifle
M24 Sniper Rifle
XM2010 ESR

Pump-action

Model 14
Model 121 Fieldmaster
Model 141
Model 572 Fieldmaster
Model 760
Remington Model Six
Remington Sportsman 76
Model 7600

Remington Model 12
Remington Model 25

Semi-automatic

Model Four
Model 8
Nylon 66
Apache 77
Model 522
Remington Model 550-1
Model 552
Model 597
Model 740
Model 742
Model 750
Model 7400
Model R-15
Model R-25
Remington RSASS

Single-shot

 Remington Rolling Block rifle family
 Remington Naval Model 1865 Pistol
 Remington-Hepburn No. 3 Falling Block Rifle
 Remington Rolling Block Model 4
 Remington Rolling Block Model 6

Automatic

 R4
 Adaptive Combat Rifle
 R5 RGP

Shotguns

Pump-action

Model 10
Model 17
Model 29
Model 31
Model 870
Model 887

Semi-automatic

Model 11 (Browning Auto-5)
Model 11-48
Model 11-87
Model 11-96 – "Euro Lightweight"
Model 58 – "Sportsman 58"
Model 878 – "878 Automaster"
Model 1100
Model SP-10
SPR 453 – "Spartan 453"
Versa Max
V3

Break-action

SPR 100
SPR 310
 Model 32
 Model 3200
 Remington Model 3
 Remington Model 9
 Remington Model 1894 SXS

Handguns

Semi-automatic

1911 R1
Remington Model 51
Remington R51
Remington RM380
Remington RP9
Remington RP45

Derringer

Remington Rider Single Shot Pistol
Remington Zig-Zag Derringer
Model 95

Revolvers

Model 1858
Model 1875
Model 1890

Other

XP-100
 Express Air Rifle

References

Footnotes

Notes

External links 
 

 
1816 establishments in New York (state)
American companies established in 1816
Ammunition manufacturers
Manufacturing companies established in 1816
Manufacturing companies disestablished in 2020
Manufacturing companies based in North Carolina
Firearm manufacturers of the United States
Private equity portfolio companies
2007 mergers and acquisitions
Companies that filed for Chapter 11 bankruptcy in 2018
Companies that filed for Chapter 11 bankruptcy in 2020